The House of Henckel von Donnersmarck is an old Austro-German noble family that originated in the former region of Spiš in Upper Hungary, now in Slovakia. The founder of the family was Henckel de Quintoforo in the 14/15th century. The original seat of the family was in Donnersmarck (Slovakian: Spišský Štvrtok).

History 
In 1417, during the time of the Council of Constance, the Holy Roman Emperor and Hungarian King, Sigismund of Luxembourg, granted the three brothers Peter, Jakob and Nicholas a coat of arms.

During the 15th and 16th centuries, John II (1481–1539), an eminent scholar, corresponded with Martin Luther, Erasmus of Rotterdam and Philipp Melanchthon. He began his career as a pastor in Levoča and Košice. Later, he stayed at the court of Louis II of Hungary and his wife, Maria of Austria. In 1531, he came to Silesia and became a canon in Breslau (Wroclaw), Silesia. He died there eight years later and was buried in the local cathedral.

Lazarus Henckel (or Lazarus the Elder; 1551–1624) was a banker and mine owner, and the financier of the Holy Roman Emperor Rudolf II's war with the Turks. In return for his service, he was given a number of privileges. In 1607, he and his sons were ennobled with the surname von Henckel von Donnersmarck. The family seat became the castle at Neudeck (Świerklaniec).

Barons
Lazarus II (or Lazarus the Younger; 1573–1664), called the Lazy, was made Baron of Gfell and Vesendorff by the Habsburg emperor, Ferdinand II, at Regensburg in 1636.

Counts
In 1651, Archduke Ferdinand Karl of the Tyrol raised his title to that of Count in the Habsburg Hereditary Lands. He received the same title in the Kingdom of Bohemia from Emperor Leopold I in 1661, that title being hereditary for all legitimate descendants, male and female, in the male line.

In 1697, the Henckels' inheritance of the Freie Standesherrschaft Beuthen (Free Lordship of Beuthen), under the Bohemian crown, obtained Imperial confirmation as a hereditary Fideicommis, a family trust heritable by masculine primogeniture, on which estate would later be based the family's admission to Prussia's House of Lords until 1918. In the following centuries, the descendants of Lazarus II split into several lines and branches.

At the beginning of the 20th century, the family was the second richest in Prussia after the Krupps. Hugo Henckel von Donnersmarck (1811–1890), a steelworks founder and owner, and Guido Henckel von Donnersmarck (1830–1916) were both wealthy industrialists. In 1854 and 1887, the family was given seats in the Prussian Hereditary House of Lords.

Princes
On 18 January 1901, Count Guido Henckel von Donnersmarck received the Prussian title of Prince from German Emperor Wilhelm II, heritable by masculine primogeniture.

Following the defeat of the Third Reich in 1945, the Henckel von Donnersmarck family lost its vast fortune due to expulsion from Silesia by Ukrainian troops of the Soviet Army.

In 2007, film director Florian Henckel von Donnersmarck received the Academy Award for Best Foreign Language Film for his spy drama, The Lives of Others.

Family members 

Lazarus (I) Henckel von Donnersmarck (1551–1624), banker and mining entrepreneur
Count Carl Maximilian Henckel von Donnersmarck, castle owner
Lazarus III, Count Henckel von Donnersmarck (1729–1805), mining industrialist
Count Elias Maximilian Henckel von Donnersmarck (1746–1827), Prussian major general
Countess Eleonore Ottilie Maximiliane Henckel von Donnersmarck (1756–1843)
Count Carl Lazarus Henckel von Donnersmarck (1772–1864), industrialist
Wilhelm Ludwig Viktor, Count Henckel von Donnersmarck (1775–1849), Prussian Lieutenant-General
Count Leo Victor Felix Henckel von Donnersmarck (1785–1861), German botanist
Hugo, Count Henckel von Donnersmarck (1811–1890), land owner and industrialist
Guido, Prince Henckel von Donnersmarck (1830–1916), land owner and industrialist, his wife was known as La Païva; she commissioned the Hotel de Païva at 25 avenue des Champs-Elysées in Paris
Count Lazarus IV Henckel von Donnersmarck (1835–1914), landowner and member of the German Reichstag
Count Dr. Victor Parry Amadeus Henckel von Donnersmarck (1854–1916), envoy at the German Embassy in Copenhagen
Countess Katharina Eleonore Veronika Irma Luise Henckel von Donnersmarck (1902–1965), actress, played the Queen of Transylvania in My Fair Lady; married in 1925 to Baron Erich von Goldschmidt-Rothschild (1899–1987)
Georg Graf Henckel von Donnersmarck, (1902–1973), politician of the Christian Social Union of Bavaria, member of parliament
Carl Joseph Graf Henckel von Donnersmarck (November 7, 1928 Romolkwitz, Neumarkt; † April 16, 2008), married Princess Marie Adelaide of Luxembourg (1924–2007), father of Count Felix Henckel von Donnersmarck (March 2, 1960; † October 28, 2007)
Augustine Heinrich Graf Henckel von Donnersmarck (1935–2005), priest
Count Leo-Ferdinand Henckel von Donnersmarck (1935–2009), President of the German Association of the Order of Malta (1997–2006)
Count Winfried Henckel von Donnersmarck, a member of the Sovereign Council of the Sovereign Military Order of Malta
Count Hugh II and Edgar Henckel von Donnersmarck, resident in the Castle Polnisch Krawarn
Count Gregor Henckel-Donnersmarck (Ulrich Maria Karl Graf Henckel von Donnersmarck; born 1943), Abott of Heiligenkreuz Abbey
Florian Graf Henckel von Donnersmarck (b. 1973), film director, screenwriter and film producer, Oscar-winner in 2007 (Best Foreign Language Film)
Heinrich Graf Henckel von Donnersmarck, CEO of the SIX Swiss Exchange (2000 to 2008)

References

Bibliography

Further reading 
 .
 .
 .
 .
 Henckel von Donnersmarckowie. Kariera i fortuna rodu, A. Kuzio-Podrucki, Bytom 2003.
 Zamki Donnersmarcków, J. A. Krawczyk, A. Kuzio-Podrucki, Radzionków 2002.
 Herbarz bytomski, A. Kuzio-Podrucki, P. Nadolski, D. Woźnicki, Bytom 2003.
 Henckel von Donnersmarckowie. Kariera i fortuna rodu, Arkadiusz Kuzio-Podrucki. Rococo, Bytom 2003  (in Polish).
 Zamki i pałace Donnersmarcków. Schlösser der Donnersmarcks, Jarosław Aleksander Krawczyk, Arkadiusz Kuzio-Podrucki: 2nd edition. Drukarnia Skill, Bytom 2003  (in German and Polish).
 Guido Graf Henckel Fürst von Donnersmarck, J. Bitta. In Schlesier des 19. Jahrhunderts (= Schlesische Lebensbilder; Volume 1). Edited by Friedrich Andreae for Historischen Kommission für Schlesien. 2nd edition. Thorbecke, Sigmaringen 1985 .
 Henckel von Donnersmarck Graf (seit 1901 Fürst) Guido, H. Nussbaum. In Biographisches Lexikon zur Deutschen Geschichte. Deutscher Verlag der Wissenschaften, Berlin 1967, Karl Obermann, Heinrich Scheel and others (editors).
 Hugo Reichsgraf Henckel Freiherr von Donnersmarck und die Geschichte seines Hauses. Vienna, c. 1890.
 Henckel von Donnersmarck Hugo. In Österreichisches Biographisches Lexicon 1815–1950. Volume 2. Verlag der Österreichischen Akademie der Wissenschaften, Vienna, 1959.
 Allgemeine Enzyklopädie der Wissenschaften und Künste, 2nd section, p. 389. H-N. Leipzig, 1829.

External links 

 Henckel von Donnesmarck family www.arekkp.pl
 

 
Silesian nobility